Fundamental theology, in John Hardon's Modern Catholic Dictionary, is a "branch of theology which establishes the fact that God has made a supernatural revelation and established the Church, founded by Christ, as its divinely authorized custodian and interpreter.".

HighBeam Encyclopedia, using an excerpt from New Catholic Encyclopedia, states that "fundamental theology", a "very literal translation" of theologia fundamentalis, is "commonly understood within Roman Catholic theology" to "refer to the introductory tract that treats the nature, possibility, and existence of revelation", and is "often used today indiscriminately" with the term foundational theology.

Unlike apologetics, fundamental theology does not directly work towards evangelization, but rather towards the analysis of where and by what means God brings human beings to assent to his Word.

See also
 Apostolic succession
 Four Marks of the Church
 Fundamentalism
 Origin myth
 Papal supremacy
 Primacy of Simon Peter
 Primacy of the Bishop of Rome
 Restorationism
 Successionism

References

External links
Fundamental Theology | Encyclopedia.com
Archived.

 
Catholic theology and doctrine